Lucile Randon  (11 February 1904 – 17 January 2023), also known as Sister André, was a French supercentenarian. Her final age of 118 years and 340 days is the fourth longest human lifespan ever verified. She was also the oldest known survivor of the COVID-19 pandemic, having tested positive for SARS-CoV-2 a month before her 117th birthday. 

As a young adult, Randon converted to Roman Catholicism and worked as a governess, teacher, nun and missionary before retiring at the age of 75 in 1979. She lived in a nursing home in Toulon, France, from 2009 until her death.

Personal life 

Randon was born on 11 February 1904 in Alès, France, to Paul Randon and Alphonsine Delphine Yéta Soutoul. Her living siblings included three older brothers and a twin sister named Lydie, who died a year after they were born. Lucile became a governess to three children in Marseille when she was twenty years old in 1924. She took on more responsibility when she was hired as both a governess and teacher to a prominent family, the Peugeots, at Versailles in 1928. Her work as a governess and teacher at Versailles lasted until 1930 when she became governess for the Borionne family in Paris and then in Ardèche, until 1944.

Randon grew up in a Huguenot Protestant family and her grandfather was a pastor. She converted to Catholicism in 1923 at the age of 19. She later joined the Catholic order Daughters of Charity in 1944, taking the name Sister André in honour of her elder brother. After World War II ended, Randon went on a mission to a hospital in Vichy, where she served orphans and elders. Her mission lasted 18 years until she was sent to another hospital at La Baume-d'Hostun, Drôme, for night duty in 1963. Randon retired from full-time work in 1979 and entered the EHPAD in the Marches at Savoie, where she continued to care for the elderly until she was 100 years old. She moved to the Ste. Catherine Labouré retirement home in Toulon on 25 October 2009, at the age of 105.

Health and longevity  
Randon was blind and used a wheelchair from the early 2010s. In January 2021, she tested positive for SARS-CoV-2 in an outbreak at her retirement home. She was asymptomatic and tested negative days before her 117th birthday, making her the oldest known survivor of the COVID-19 pandemic.

After the death of Honorine Rondello on 19 October 2017, she became the oldest living person in France. When she turned 115 in 2019, Pope Francis sent her a personal letter and blessed rosary. In 2021, she said she was happy at her home, although she wished to join her grandparents and brother André in heaven.

On her 118th birthday in February 2022, Randon received a birthday note from the French president, Emmanuel Macron. On 19 April 2022, she became the world's oldest verified living person after the death of Kane Tanaka. She felt this was a "sad honour", saying: "I feel I would be better off in heaven, but the good Lord doesn't want me yet." At that time she was reported to still eat chocolate and drink a glass of wine each day.

Randon died in her sleep at her nursing home in Toulon on 17 January 2023, at the age of 118 years and 340 days, the fourth-oldest verified person ever. Maria Branyas then became the world's oldest validated living person.

See also 
 List of French supercentenarians
 List of European supercentenarians
 List of the verified oldest people
 Oldest people

References

External links 
 
 

1904 births
2023 deaths
20th-century French nuns
21st-century French nuns
Converts to Roman Catholicism from Calvinism
French supercentenarians
People from Alès
Women supercentenarians